Nana Amuah-Afenyi VI (born Peggielene Bartels in 1953), known informally as King Peggy, is the reigning chief of the town of Tantum (or Otuam), in the Mfantsiman Municipal District, Ghana. Born in the Gold Coast (now Ghana) and a naturalized citizen of the United States since 1997, she moved to the United States in the 1970s when she was in her early twenties to work as a secretary at the Embassy of Ghana in Washington, D.C., where she still works. Following the death of her uncle in 2008, she was selected as his successor through a series of traditional rituals. She is a devout Christian, and she lives in Silver Spring, Maryland.

Life

Bartels' husband, William Bartels, is a member of the Euro-African Bartels family, whose ancestor Cornelius Ludewich Bartels was Governor-General of the Dutch Gold Coast between 1798 and 1804, and whose son Carel Hendrik Bartels was the most prominent biracial slave trader on the Gold Coast in the second quarter of the nineteenth century.

Since her accession, Bartels has spent several weeks each year in Ghana on the anniversary of her coronation. She is notably the village's first female chief; she plans to become a full-time ruler after her retirement from the embassy.

"King" is the traditional title for the ruler of Otuam. Bartels, Otuam's first female King, prefers the title to "Queen." She has stated, "Most of the time, a king is the one who has all the executive power to do things, while the queen is mostly in charge of the children's affairs and reporting to the king. So I really love this." The residents of Otuam also traditionally address Bartels as "Nana," which is an honorary title given to royalty and also to women with grandchildren.

Bartels wakes every morning at 1 am to call Otuam in order to keep up with her regent and elders in order to carry out her duties as King. She also visits Otuam for a month every year. So far, Bartels has helped poor families pay school fees for their children, brought computers to classrooms, and helped provide Otuam with its first ambulance, as well as access to clean, running water.  Since her retirement from the Ghanaian embassy in Washington, D.C., King Peggy has opened a travel agency providing informed tours of Ghana and supporting her many local improvements.

Dominion

Among Bartels' territorial possessions as chief are a  family-owned estate and an eight-bedroom palace.

Tantum is a coastal fishing village in Mfantsiman Municipal District. (It may be part of the Ekumfi District, which was formed from part of the Mfantseman District in 2012.)

Book

She and writer Eleanor Herman have co-written King Peggy, published in 2012 by Doubleday.

References

Living people
1953 births
African-American Christians
African kings
Women rulers in Africa
Ghanaian Christians
Ghanaian emigrants to the United States
Ghanaian people of German descent
Ghanaian royalty
Secretaries
Fante people